Andrew Kyle was an American Negro league outfielder in the 1920s.

Kyle played for the Baltimore Black Sox in 1922. In ten recorded games, he posted eight hits in 19 plate appearances.

References

External links
Baseball statistics and player information from Baseball-Reference Black Baseball Stats and Seamheads

Year of birth missing
Year of death missing
Place of birth missing
Place of death missing
Baltimore Black Sox players
Baseball outfielders